Married to the Enemy is a 2006 Nigerian drama film directed Willie Adah Ajenge. The film was produced by Andy K. Nwawulhe.

Cast
 Rita Dibia
 Moses Ebere
 Ini Edo
 Desmond Elliot
 Mercy Johnson
 Cosmos Okey

References

External links
 

2006 films
English-language Nigerian films
2006 drama films
Nigerian drama films
2000s English-language films